Luca Gagliano (born 14 July 2000) is an Italian professional footballer who plays as a forward for  club Padova.

Club career

Cagliari 
Gagliano joined the youth academy of Cagliari in 2014. Gagliano made his professional debut with Cagliari in a 2–1 Serie A defeat to Lazio on 23 July 2020. He scored his first goal in the following match against Juventus, won 2–0 by Cagliari. He also became the first player born in the 21st century to score a goal against Juventus.

Loan to Olbia 
On 9 September he extended his contract for Cagliari until 2023. On the same day he went to Olbia on loan.

Loan to Avellino 
On 20 August 2021, he joined Avellino on loan. On 4 January 2022, he was recalled from loan.

Padova
On 9 July 2022, Gagliano signed a three-year deal with Padova.

References

External links

 Lega Serie A Profile

2000 births
Living people
People from Alghero
Footballers from Sardinia
Italian footballers
Association football forwards
Cagliari Calcio players
Olbia Calcio 1905 players
U.S. Avellino 1912 players
Calcio Padova players
Serie A players
Serie C players